Italian American Bank is a historic building built in 1907, and located on 460 Montgomery Street in San Francisco, California. The Italian American Bank building has been listed as a San Francisco Designated Landmark since April 6, 1980.

History 
A brick building with 7-stories was in the same location, owned by the Italian American Bank, and was destroyed during the 1906 San Francisco earthquake. 

The 1907, a 2-story replacement building was designed by the architecture firm Howard & Galloway and built during a period of reconstruction in the neighborhood, using steel reinforced concrete, bricks, and granite. The Italian American Bank has a basement level.

The building was subject to facadism by architectural firm Roger Owen Boyer and Associates, and it was combined with the neighboring Borel & Co. building (1908), in order to create 456 Montgomery Plaza.

See also 

 Fugazi Bank Building
 List of San Francisco Designated Landmarks

References 

Buildings and structures in San Francisco
Financial District, San Francisco
San Francisco Designated Landmarks
Former bank buildings
Buildings and structures completed in 1907